David William Charlton (27 October 1936 – 24 February 2013) was a racing driver from South Africa.

Charlton was born in Brotton, Yorkshire. He participated in 13 World Championship Formula One Grands Prix, debuting on 1 January 1965. He scored no championship points. He competed in many non-World Championship Formula One races, winning the South African Formula One Championship six times in succession from 1970 to 1975.

Charlton died in Johannesburg, South Africa on 24 February 2013, aged 76.

Complete Formula One World Championship results
  
(key) (Races in bold indicate pole position)

References

1936 births
2013 deaths
English emigrants to South Africa
South African racing drivers
South African Formula One drivers
Brabham Formula One drivers
Team Lotus Formula One drivers
Scuderia Scribante Formula One drivers